Pachitla is an unincorporated community in Randolph County, in the U.S. state of Georgia.

History
Pachitla is a name derived from a Native American language meaning either "dead pigeon", "pigeon town" or "opossum".

References

Unincorporated communities in Randolph County, Georgia